Miso Film is a film and television production company based in Copenhagen, Denmark. It was founded by Jonas Allen and Peter Bose in 2004.

History  
Jonas Allen and Peter Bose initially met at Per Holst Film/Nordisk Film in 1999. Later, they continued their collaboration with FilmPeople and Yellow Bird, before setting up their own company in 2005. In November 2014, FremantleMedia acquired 51 percent of Miso Film.

Selected productions

Film
 Max Manus: Man of War (2008)
 The Candidate (2008)
 Jensen & Jensen (2011)
 Ginger & Rosa (2012)
 Fortidens skygge (2012)
 Dannys Dommedag (2014)
 Lang historie kort (Long Story Short) (2015)
 Small Town Killers (2017)
 The Way to Mandalay (2018)
 Iqbal & the Indian Jewel (2018)
 438 days (2019)
 I'll be home for Christmas (2019)
 Selvhenter (Heavy Load) (2019)
 Skyggen i mit øje / The Bombardment (2021)
 Blasted (2022)

Television
 Varg Veum (2008)
 Those Who Kill (2011) and Darkness: Those Who Kill (2019, 2021, 2023)
 Dicte (2013)
 1864 (2014)
 The Rain (2018)
 Heksejakt (Witch Hunt) (2020)
 The Investigation (2020)
 Elves (2021)
 Face to Face (2019, 2021, 2023)
 Box 21 (2021)
 Cell 8 (2022)
 Lust (2022)

References

External links
 

Film production companies of Denmark
Television production companies of Denmark
Mass media companies based in Copenhagen
Mass media companies established in 2004
Danish companies established in 2004
RTL Group
Companies based in Copenhagen Municipality